Canara Bank is a central public sector bank under the ownership of Ministry of Finance, Government of India. Established in 1906 at Mangalore by Ammembal Subba Rao Pai, the cpsu also has offices in London, Dubai and New York.

History
Ammembal Subba Rao Pai, a philanthropist, established the Canara Hindu Permanent Fund in Mangalore, India, on 1 July 1906.

Canara Bank's first acquisition took place in 1961 when it acquired Bank of Kerala. This had been founded in September 1944 and at the time of its acquisition on 20 May 1961 had three branches. The second bank that Canara Bank acquired was Seasia Midland Bank (Alleppey), which had been established on 26 July 1930 and had seven branches at the time of its takeover.

In 1958, the Reserve Bank of India had ordered Canara Bank to acquire G. Raghumathmul Bank, in Hyderabad. This bank had been established in 1870, and had converted to a limited company in 1925. At the time of the acquisition G. Raghumathmul Bank had five branches. The merger took effect in 1961. Later in 1961, Canara Bank acquired Trivandrum Permanent Bank. This had been founded on 7 February 1899 and had 14 branches at the time of the merger.

Canara Bank acquired four banks in 1963: the Sree Poornathrayeesa Vilasam Bank, Thrippunithura, Arnad Bank, Tiruchirapalli, Cochin Commercial Bank, Cochin, and Pandyan Bank, Madurai. Sree Poornathrayeesa Vilasam Bank had been established on 21 February 1923 and at the time of its acquisition it had 14 branches. Arnad Bank had been established on 23 December 1942 and at the time of its acquisition had only one branch. Cochin Commercial Bank had been established on 3 January 1936, and at the time of its acquisition had 13 branches.

The government of India nationalised Canara Bank, along with 13 other major commercial banks of India, on 19 July 1969. Karkala Pulkeri Janardhan Prabhu  (KPJ Prabhu) served as chairman of the Bank post nationalisation of the Canara bank in 1969 by Government of India.In 1976, Canara Bank inaugurated its 1000th branch. In 1985, Canara Bank acquired Lakshmi Commercial Bank in a rescue.

In 1996, Canara Bank became the first Indian Bank to get ISO certification for "Total Branch Banking" for its Seshadripuram branch in Bangalore. Canara Bank has now stopped opting for ISO certification of branches.

On 30 August 2019, Finance Minister Nirmala Sitharaman announced that Syndicate Bank would be merged with Canara Bank. The Board of Directors of Canara Bank approved the merger on 13 September. The Union Cabinet approved the merger on 4 March 2020. The merger was completed on 1 April 2020 with Syndicate Bank shareholders receiving 158 equity shares in the former for every 1,000 shares they hold.

Shareholding 
As of December 2022, the promoter holding at the bank is 62.93%, the institutional holding is 25.37%, and the public holding is 11.69%.

Overseas Presence
Canara Bank established its international division in 1976. In 1983, Canara Bank opened its first overseas office, a branch in London. Two years later, Canara Bank established a subsidiary in Hong Kong, Indo Hong Kong International Finance. In 2008–9, Canara Bank opened its third foreign operation, this one a branch in Shanghai. Later Canara Bank established a branch each in Leicester and Bahrain, and converted its Hong Kong subsidiary into a branch.

Since 1983, Canara Bank has been responsible for the management of Eastern Exchange Co. WLL, Doha, Qatar, which Abdul Rahman M.M. Al Muftah established in 1979.

Divisions

 Canfin Homes Limited (CFHL), with a network of 110 branches and 28 satellite offices throughout India
 Canbank Factors Limited
 Canbank Venture Capital Fund Limited
 Canbank Computer Services Limited
 Canara Bank Securities Limited
Canara Robeco Asset Management Company Limited
 Canbank Financial Services Limited
 Canara HSBC  Life Insurance Company Limited

Development projects
Canara Bank partnered with UNEP to initiate a solar loan program.

Empower
Canara Bank offers Unified Payment Interface (UPI) app named “empower”. This app empowers Canara Bank and other Bank customers to perform pay and collect transactions using a single mobile app. On 19 November 2017, it launched Canarites (Candi) app, a digital library, a field recovery mobile app, a retail loan (vehicle) – tracking system, and a regulatory guidance tracking system.

On 7 May 2020, Bhanu Srivastav from Canara Bank, partnered with NGOs to donate all his royalty proceeds for the betterment of needy children. He is working at Canara Bank Head Office, in Human Resource Department and a bestselling author of novel 'Hacker 404 Happiness not found'.

On 23 May 2020, Canara Bank announced credit support for borrowers affected by COVID-19 to enable them to avail the sanctioned facilities to the full extent and improve their business.

On 19 July 2020, Canara Bank announced to raise up to Rs 8,000 crore equity capital in Financial Year 2021 to strengthen capital base and to boost capital adequacy ratio in view of expansion plans. The Bank will seek nod from shareholders for the same in its AGM in August 2020.

Controversies

Money Laundering
On 6 June 2018, the UK division of Canara Bank was fined £890,000 ($1.2 million) by the UK's Financial Conduct Authority and was blocked from accepting new deposits for around five months for systematic anti-money laundering (AML) failures.

Gallery

See also

 Banking in India
 List of banks in India
 Reserve Bank of India
 Indian Financial System Code
 List of largest banks
 List of companies of India
 Make in India

References

Bibliography

External links

 

Public Sector Banks in India
Banks based in Karnataka
Companies based in Bangalore
Banks established in 1906
Companies nationalised by the Government of India
Indian companies established in 1906
Companies based in Mangalore
Banks established in Mangalore
Companies listed on the National Stock Exchange of India
Companies listed on the Bombay Stock Exchange